The phrase "Sick man of Asia",  or "Sick man of East Asia" when referring specifically to China, is a term denoting a country in Asia undergoing economic or political strife. It originally referred to Qing China in the late 19th and early 20th centuries which, experiencing internal divisions and social upheaval at the time, was taken advantage of by the great powers.

Early usage 
The term "sick man of Europe" was initially coined in 1853 by Tsar Nicholas I to refer to the Ottoman Empire, which was then in a state of decline. After World War I the phrase was applied to various European countries including France, Italy, the United Kingdom, Spain and Germany.

One of the earliest instances of the term "sick man" being applied to China was in the January 5, 1863 edition of the Daily News in an article about the ongoing Taiping Rebellion. That article was reprinted in the January 7, 1863 edition of the Belfast Morning News under the title "The Supposed 'Sick Man' in China." 

In 1895, after Japan defeated China in the First Sino-Japanese War, Chinese writer Yan Fu described China as a "sick man" (病夫) in an article titled "On the Origin of Strength" (原強) in his newspaper Zhibao, helping popularize the term among Chinese intellectuals. 

In 1896, the British-run North China Daily News published an article stating: "There are four sick people of the world – Turkey, Persia, China, Morocco ... China is the Sick Man of the East." The phrase was not intended to be a derogatory comment on Chinese people's health, but rather a metaphor for the corruption and incompetence of the Qing government. Around then, the phrase was adopted by Chinese thinkers who aimed to reform the Qing government, among them Liang Qichao and Kang Youwei. It was Liang who, in his 1902 New People, first associated "sick man" with the physical health of the Chinese population, which was then afflicted by opium addiction, linking it to China's inability to defend itself militarily. According to Jui-sung Yang, professor at the National Chengchi University, although Chinese intellectuals such as Zeng Pu initially agreed with the description of China as a "sick man", the term gradually became seen as a way in which the Westerners were mocking, humiliating, and insulting China.

Contemporary usage 
One of the most prominent 20th-century uses of the phrase was in the 1972 Hong Kong film Fist of Fury starring Bruce Lee, which was released across Asia. According to Chinese writer Chang Ping, that film, and others, combined with Chinese education about its "century of humiliation", have linked the term "sick man" with Chinese colonial history, making it a symbol of foreign bullying.
 
Recently, the term has been applied to countries other than China. For example, an April 2009 article entitled "The Sick Man of Asia"  refers to Japan, not China.

The Philippines has also been referred to as the sick man of Asia during the time of Ferdinand Marcos as president in the 1970s until his ouster in 1986. The country managed to rise economically afterwards, where in 2013, under the presidency of Benigno Aquino III, the country was dubbed by the World Bank as Asia's Rising Tiger. In 2014, the Japan External Trade Organization survey showed "the Philippines as the second most profitable among ASEAN-5 countries, next to Thailand," formally abolishing the "sick man" status of the Philippines. However, during the presidency of Rodrigo Duterte, several commentators have argued that due to the slow growth of the economy and the administration's handling of the COVID-19 pandemic, the Philippines has restored its "sick man" status.

During the COVID-19 pandemic, India began to be referred to as the "sick man of Asia"  as a double entendre after its government's poor management of the pandemic, with significant loss of life, wide disease expression, the eruption of the delta variant, and substantial economic difficulties.

2020 Wall Street Journal article
On February 3, 2020, The Wall Street Journal published an opinion piece by Walter Russell Mead regarding the COVID-19 epidemic entitled, China is the Real Sick Man of Asia. On February 19, Chinese Foreign Ministry spokesperson Geng Shuang issued a statement revoking the press credentials of three Wall Street Journal reporters and ordering their expulsion. The statement said the WSJ article "slandered" China's efforts in fighting COVID-19
and "used such [a] racially discriminatory title, triggering indignation and condemnation among the Chinese people and the international community."  The Wall Street Journal editorial board then published a piece noting that while the term "sick man" may be seen as "insensitive", the Chinese government's actions were intended to divert public attention from its management of the coronavirus or in retaliation for the U.S. government designating Chinese state-run media operating in the U.S. as foreign missions.

See also

 Century of humiliation
 Concessions in China
 List of Chinese treaty ports
 PIGS (economics)
 Qing conquest theory
 Sick man of Europe
 Unequal treaty

References

Qing dynasty
Political slurs
Politics of China
Chinese nationalism